The One...Cohesive is the fourth studio album by American hip hop duo G-Side. It was released by Slow Motion Soundz on January 1, 2011.

Critical reception

At Metacritic, which assigns a weighted average score out of 100 to reviews from mainstream critics, the album received an average score of 82, based on 6 reviews, indicating "universal acclaim".

Spin placed it at number 8 on the "50 Best Albums of 2011" list. Cokemachineglow placed it at number 24 on the "Top 50 Albums 2011" list. Pitchfork included it on the "Overlooked Records 2011" list.

Track listing

References

External links
 

2011 albums
G-Side albums